Radulodon copelandii or Radulomyces copelandii, the Asian beauty, is a fungus typically found on logs and decaying wood. It is native to Asia, where it is known from the Russian Far East, China, Japan, Korea, the Philippines, Malaysia, and Sri Lanka. It now also occurs in North America, where it was first found by J. Ginns and Lawrence Millman in Massachusetts in 2009. It is a toothed crust fungus identified by whitish or pale yellowish flattened teeth aging to brownish colors. The basidia are at the tip of each tooth

References 

Meruliaceae